Moyenneville is the name of three communes in France:
 Moyenneville, Oise
 Moyenneville, Pas-de-Calais
 Moyenneville, Somme